This was the first edition of the tournament, Thiemo de Bakker won the title defeating Grega Žemlja in the final 3–6, 6–3, 6–1.

Seeds

Draw

Finals

Top half

Bottom half

References
 Main Draw
 Qualifying Draw

Las Vegas Challenger - Singles
Las Vegas Challenger